The Vietnamese sika deer (Cervus nippon pseudaxis) also known as the indochinese sika deer is one of the many subspecies of the sika deer. It is one of the smaller subspecies, due to the tropical environment they live in. They were previously found in northern Vietnam and possibly southwestern China, but may now be extinct in the wild. There are plans for reintroducing this subspecies in the future.

References

Cervus
Mammals of Asia